The Golden Gate of Kyiv was the main gate in the 11th century fortifications of Kiev (today Kyiv), the capital of Kievan Rus'. It was named in imitation of the Golden Gate of Constantinople. The structure was dismantled in the Middle Ages, leaving few vestiges of its existence. It was rebuilt completely by the Soviet authorities in 1982, though no images of the original gates have survived. The decision has been immensely controversial because there were many competing reconstructions of what the original gate might have looked like.

The rebuilt structure on the corner of Volodymyr street and Yaroslaviv Val Street contains a branch of the National Sanctuary "Sophia of Kyiv" museum. The name Zoloti Vorota is also used for a nearby theater and the Zoloti Vorota station of the Kyiv Metro.

History

Modern history accepts this gateway as one of three constructed by Yaroslav the Wise. The golden gates were built in 1017-1024 (6545 by the Byzantine calendar) at about the same time the Saint Sophia Cathedral was erected. Mentions of an older construction, such as the one presented on a painting by Jan Matejko of king Bolesław I of Poland striking the Golden Gate with his sword during the intervention in the Kyivan succession crisis in 1018, it is now regarded a legend. Originally named simply the Southern Gate, it was one of the three main entrances to the walled city, along with the Ladski and Zhydivski (Polish and Jewish) Gates. The last two have not survived. The stone fortifications stretched for only 3.5 km. The fortification of the Old Kyiv (Upper City) stretched from the Southern Gates down to what is now Independence Square and where the Lechitic Gate was located. From there, the moat followed what is now Kostyol Street, skirting St. Michael's Monastery and continuing along today's Zhytomyr Street toward the Jewish Gates (at Lviv Square). From there, the fortification stretched what is now Yaroslaviv Val ("Yaroslav's Rampart") Street back to the Southern Gate.

Later, the Southern Gate became known as the Great Gate of Kyiv. After the Blahovist Church (Church of the Annunciation) was built next to the gate, its golden domes became a prominent landmark easily visible from outside the city. Since then, the gateway has been referred to as the Golden Gate of Kyiv. For almost half a millennium, it served as the city's Triumphal Arch, a prominent symbol of Kyiv. Reputedly, it was  modeled on the Golden Gate of Constantinople. Later, a similar name was given to the gates of Vladimir city where one of the Monomakh's descendants, Andrei I Bogolyubsky, established his own state, the Grand Duchy of Vladimir. In 1240, the gate was partially destroyed by Batu Khan's Golden Horde. It remained as a gate to the city (often used for ceremonies) through the eighteenth century, although it gradually fell into ruins. 

In 1832, Metropolitan Eugenius had the ruins excavated and an initial survey for their conservation was undertaken.  Further works in the 1970s added an adjacent pavilion, housing a museum of the gate. In the museum, visitors can learn about the history of construction of the Golden gate as well as ancient Kyiv.

In 1982, the gate was completely reconstructed for the 1500th anniversary of Kyiv, though this was challenged. Some art historians called for this reconstruction to be demolished and for the ruins of the original gate to be exposed to public view. 

In 1989, with the expansion of the Kyiv Metro, Zoloti Vorota station was opened nearby to the landmark. Its architectural assemble is based on the internal decorations of ancient Ruthenian churches.

In 1997, the monument to Yaroslav the Wise was unveiled near the west end face of the Golden Gate. It is an enlarged bronze copy of an experimental figuring by Kavaleridze.

Church above the passage
In addition to mentioning the construction of the church above the passage of the Golden Gate in the chronicle, it is also mentioned in Metropolitan Ilarion's "Word of Law and Grace" of the Golden Gate.

Gate Church had to serve "the heavenly protection of the city", but was also a regular church – people arrived to pray there.

The bell chapel is reproduced in the form of a three-nave four-pillar single-dome temple. In the architectural decoration of the facades used ornaments from the brick, typical for the ancient buildings of that period. The floor of the church is decorated with a mosaic, the picture of which is based on the ancient floor design of Saint Sophia's Cathedral in Kyiv.

Reconstruction of the monument reproduces the segments of the shaft adjoining to the gate. On the outside they have suspended slopes. At the top of the shaft there are wooden bunks. On the ends conventionally shown internal structures. From the city side on the facade there are warehouses. Inside the restored shaft segments there is an exposition of the Museum of the Golden Gate and the stairs leading to the balcony, from which a magnificent panorama of the city is visible.

Square 
The  was created in the second half of the 19th century. Botanical natural monument was created by the decision of the Kyiv executive committee № 363 20 March 1972.

See also 
 Golden Gates in Vladimir, the only extant example of a gateway of medieval Rus'.
 Pictures at an Exhibition, by composer Modest Mussorgsky, is a musical suite, one part of which was inspired by Viktor Hartmann's project for another gate in Kyiv.

References

External links
 
 Kiev Info - History of the gate
 Golden Gate at the Encyclopedia of Ukraine
  oldkyiv.org.ua - History of the gate

1500th anniversary of Kyiv

Architectural monuments of Ukraine of national importance in Kyiv
Buildings and structures completed in 1024
Buildings and structures in Kyiv
Gates in Ukraine
History of Kyiv
Rebuilt buildings and structures in Ukraine
Shevchenkivskyi District, Kyiv
Tourist attractions in Kyiv
Volodymyrska Street